Alpha-1,3-mannosyl-glycoprotein 2-beta-N-acetylglucosaminyltransferase is an enzyme that in humans is encoded by the MGAT1 gene.

There are over 100 different glycosyltransferases involved in the synthesis of protein-bound and lipid-bound oligosaccharides. UDP-N-acetylglucosamine:alpha-3-D-mannoside beta-1,2-N-acetylglucosaminyltransferase I is a medial-Golgi enzyme essential for the synthesis of hybrid and complex N-glycans.  The protein, encoded by a single exon, shows typical features of a type II transmembrane protein. The protein is believed to be essential for normal embryogenesis.

References

Further reading